

Wait meaning and variations 

The word 'Wait," anciently spelled Wayghte or Wayte, is derived from the old high German wahten (to keep watch); it is common in the sense of guard or watchman to all the Teutonic languages, the German wacht, Dutch vaght, Swedish vakt and English watch. When used as a verb, its meaning is "to stay in expectation of"; as a noun, it denotes a minstrel watchmen.

When surnames were generally introduced into England in the eleventh century, those who held an office in most cases added its designation to their Christian names, thus: Richard, the minstrel-watchman, who was known as Richard le (the) Wayte, afterward contracted to Richard Wayte. The name has since been spelled Wayte, Wavt, Wayght, Waight, Wait, Waitt, Waite, Wate, Weight, Waiet, etc.

Notable people include

Wait 
 Benjamin Wait (1813–1895), Canadian businessman and author
 Daniel Guilford Wait (1789–1850), English clergyman, Hebrew scholar and religious writer
 Georgiana Claudie Wait, Indonesian actress
 Harry Wait (1891–1975), English footballer
 James R. Wait, electrical engineer and engineering physicist
 John T. Wait (1811–1899), U.S. Representative from Connecticut
 Phoebe Jane Babcock Wait (1838–1904), American physician
 William Bell Wait (1839–1916), teacher in the New York Institute for the Education of the Blind
 John Wait McGauvran (1827–1884), merchant and political figure in Quebec
 Norman Wait Harris (1846–1916), American banker
 Wait Winthrop (1641–1717), colonial magistrate, military officer, and politician of New England

Waitt 
Charlie Waitt (1853–1912), professional baseball player
Chris Waitt (born 1974), independent filmmaker, musician and writer
Maude C. Waitt, former member of the Ohio Senate
Mick Waitt, association football coach who managed the New Zealand national football team
Richard Waitt (died 1732), Scottish painter
Ted Waitt (born 1963), American billionaire, co-founder of Gateway, Inc

Weight 
 Carel Weight, a British artist
 Doug Weight, an American ice hockey player
 Greg Weight, an Australian photographer

Waite 
 Arthur Edward Waite, occultist and co-creator of the Rider-Waite tarot deck
 Arthur Waite (racing driver), Australian racing driver
 Catharine Van Valkenburg Waite, United States author, lawyer and women's suffrage activist.
 David Waite, Australian rugby league coach
 Edgar Ravenswood Waite, Australian zoologist 
 Harold Roy Waite (1884-1978), American aviator
 Jimmy Waite, ice hockey goaltender
 John Waite, British rock singer
 John Waite (cricketer), South African wicketkeeper–opening batsman
 John Musgrave Waite (1820-1884), Victorian fencing master
 Morrison Waite, U.S. Supreme Court Justice, 1874–1888
 Ralph Waite (1928–2014), American actor, best known for the role of John Walton on the TV series The Waltons
 Reginald Waite, Royal Air Force officer
 Terry Waite, British humanitarian and author
 Thomas Waite (regicide), English Member of Parliament and one of the regicides of King Charles I
 Thomas Waite (Under-Secretary for Ireland), 1747–1774
 Tommy Waite (born 1972), Northern Irish boxer of the 1990s and 2000s
 Waite Hoyt, American baseball player

Wayte 
 Mary Wayte, former competition swimmer
 Anthony Wayte, the Archdeacon of Lewes from 1520 to 1527
 Billy Wayte, Canadian Football League, defensive back
 William Wayte, Church of England clergyman and a British chess master
 Wayte Raymond, a numismatist

See also
Waite (name)
Waitt
Weight (disambiguation)

References